Osei Tutu Senior High School is an all-boys senior high school located in Akropong in the Ashanti Region of Ghana. It is ranked among the best senior high schools in the Ashanti Region.

Established in 1940 as one of the Royal Institutions in the Ashanti Region, Osei Tutu began as a boys’ boarding school through to a training college before being converted into a secondary institution in the early 1970s.

History 

Established in 1940 as one of the Royal Institutions in the Ashanti Region, Osei Tutu Senior High School, named after the founder of the Ashanti Kingdom, Otumfuo Osei Tutu I, is seen as an epitome of the rich culture and tradition of Asanteman.

The school was founded by the Methodist Church of Ghana and started as a Middle Boys Boarding School at a bungalow at the Freeman College opposite the Wesley College in Kumasi.

The school started with its first headmaster, Rev. Arthur W. Banks (M.A B.Sc), assisted by Messrs A. C. Denteh and Eric Awua with 13 students. These students included Dr. Charles Graham, one-time senior lecturer of KNUST, Mr Isaac Oguame Tenney  (B.Sc, B.Com), former solicitor and advisor to the Bank of Ghana, Mr. Peter Kofi (B.A, B.Com), and celebrated Black Stars midfielder and coach, James Adjei.

The school was moved to its current location at Asante-Akropong in 1948 under the leadership of Mr. J.G Quansah, then Manager of Avenida Hotel in Accra. Enrollment at the time was 120 boys and 5 teachers. The school was however closed down in November 1954, because parents could not afford the increase in the school fees.

On 24 November 1955, the school was reopened as a two-year Certificate 'B' Training College with the late A.K Folson as its first principal. This phase began with 60 students and 5 tutors.

Mr. Folson was succeeded by Rev. C.K Yamoah, B.D (London), a one-time President of the Methodist Church on 20 September 1961. At this stage, the student population stood at 160 with 7 tutors.

The college later changed from a two-year Certificate 'B' to a four-year Certificate 'A' in 1965. On 22 September 1966, Mr. J.O.T Ansah B.A (Hons) D.A, E.d succeeded Rev. Yamoah as principal.

In the 1972/73 Academic year, when a number of Training Colleges in the country were converted into secondary schools, Osei Tutu Training College was affected and had to be run as a dual institution until the Training College component was phased out.

Mr. J.O.T Ansah led the conversion of the school from a training college into a secondary school and was succeeded by Mr. Amo Polley, who was Vice Principal of the school.

Competitions 
The school has been competing at the National Science and Maths Quiz over the years.

Has also been competing in debate and won Ashanti regional zonal debate for 2020 independence debate

Notable alumni 
The school has produced several notable alumni including

Justice Kweku Etrew Amua-Sekyi (Supreme Court Judge and Chairman of the National Reconciliation Committee of Ghana),

John Kufuor Former President of Ghana

Dr Kwame Addo-Kufuor, a former Minister of Defence

Hon. Samuel Sarpong former Ashanti Regional Minister

Dr. Charles Graham, senior lecturer at the Kwame Nkrumah University of Science and Technology,

Mr Isaac Oguame Tenney  (B.Sc, B.Com), former solicitor and advisor to the Bank of Ghana,

Black Stars midfielder and coach, James Adjei.

Former Inspector General of the Ghana Police Service, Nana Owusu-Nsiah

References
Oppong Isaac Gabriel. OTSHS ICT DEPARTMENT, DATE ALTERED 20-11-2020. www.otshs.edu.gh

Schools in Ghana
Education in Kumasi
Educational institutions established in 1940
1940 establishments in Gold Coast (British colony)
Boys' schools in Ghana